Meols Hall is a historical manor house in Churchtown, Merseyside, dating from the 12th century with a 16th-century tithe barn restored for wedding receptions and ceremonies.

History 

Meols Hall dates back to the late 12th century when the manor was granted to Robert de Coudray of Penwortham. The manor has been passed down through marriage and inheritance to the present incumbent. In the 16th century, it was inherited by Alice Kitchin. She married Hugh, an illegitimate son of the Heskeths of Rufford. Subsequent generations have styled themselves or changed their name to Hesketh. Much of the old house was demolished in the mid 18th century, reducing the building to its mid-17th-century core and a wing dating from c. 1695. Meols Hall was subsequently used as a farmhouse, until the family of Charles Hesketh (né Bibby) took residence in 1919.

Modest additions were made to the house in 1938, but the main reconstruction work was carried out between 1960 and 1964 by Roger Fleetwood  Hesketh to his own design. This included the three-storeyed red brick east front built in the style of Francis Smith of Warwick, and used stonework from Lathom House, rescued as it was about to be dumped in a disused Liverpool dock.

Meols Hall has been acclaimed as "one of the most convincing country houses" constructed since World War II, and is a grade II* listed building.

See also
Listed buildings in Churchtown, Merseyside

References

External links 
 Meols Hall official website

Buildings and structures in the Metropolitan Borough of Sefton
Grade II* listed buildings in Merseyside
Country houses in Merseyside
Grade II* listed houses